Mark McCormick may refer to:

Mark McCormick (Santa Barbara), character on the television soap opera Santa Barbara
Mark McCormick (judge) (born 1933), justice on the Iowa Supreme Court from 1972 to 1986
Mark McCormick, golfer who won the 2008 New Jersey State Open
 Mark McCormick, Ireland, baseball player chosen in the 2005 Major League Baseball draft who never played in the MLB
Mark McCormick, Northern Ireland, footballer who was a non-participating sideline player in the 2000 Scottish Challenge Cup Final
Mark McCormick, American motorcycle racer who competed in the 2011 AMA Pro Daytona Sportbike Championship

See also
Mark McCormack (disambiguation)